Art "Dustbowl" Fowler (1902 – April 4, 1953) was an American actor and musician known as "The Wizard of the Ukulele". He played tenor ukulele accompanied by a gentle croon. Among his hits are "No Wonder She's a Blushing Bride", "Crazy Words, Crazy Tune" and "Just a Bird's Eye View of My Old Kentucky Home".

From Oklahoma, Fowler took up ukulele around 1922, playing professionally from 1925 with his first professional performance at the Metropolitan Picture House in Los Angeles. He went on to tour internationally and in 1927 he travelled to England for a series of performances after being discovered by Gerald Samson while performing in New York City.

Filmography
 Tonto Basin Outlaws (1941)
 Arizona Trail (1943)
 West of Texas (1943)
 Black Market Rustlers (1943)
 Law Men (1944)
 West of the Rio Grande  (1944)
 Range Law (1944)

References

1902 births
1953 deaths
American ukulele players
20th-century American male actors
20th-century American musicians